Indomarengo is a genus of the spider family Salticidae (jumping spiders).

Name
The genus name is combined from India and the salticid genus Marengo. (See also Afromarengo.)

Species
, the World Spider Catalog accepted the following species:
 Indomarengo chandra Benjamin, 2004 – Sumatra
 Indomarengo chavarapater Malamel, Prajapati, Sudhikumar & Sebastian, 2019 – India
 Indomarengo sarawakensis Benjamin, 2004 – Java, Borneo
 Indomarengo thomsoni (Wanless, 1978) – Borneo
 Indomarengo yui Wang & Li, 2020 – China

References

Salticidae
Spiders of Asia
Salticidae genera